Montgomery Pike Berry ( — December 28, 1898) was a collector of customs for the United States Department of the Treasury, and from June 14, 1877, to August 13, 1877, was the highest-ranking federal official in the Department of Alaska, making him the de facto governor of the territory.

Berry was born in Kentucky, and served in the Mexican-American War and the American Civil War, rising to the rank of Major. He was also sheriff of Grant County, Oregon and Superintendent of the Oregon State Penitentiary before President Ulysses S. Grant appointed him as collector of customs in March 1874. He lived in Sitka, Alaska until his death.

References

1820s births
1898 deaths
19th-century American military personnel
19th-century American politicians
American military personnel of the Mexican–American War
American prison wardens
Burials at Sitka National Cemetery
Commanders of the Department of Alaska
Oregon sheriffs
People from Grant County, Oregon
People of Kentucky in the American Civil War
Politicians from Salem, Oregon
People from Wasco County, Oregon
United States Army officers
United States Customs Service personnel
People from Sitka, Alaska
Military personnel from Oregon